ACE Cash Express, Inc. is a financial services provider headquartered in Irving, Texas. ACE serves customers in 24 states and the District of Columbia both online and through a network of stores. Founded in 1968, ACE provides a range of retail financial products and services including short-term consumer loans, check cashing, debit card services, money transfers, bill payments and money orders. ACE Cash Express is one of the largest owners and operators of check cashing stores in the United States. ACE serves consumers seeking alternatives to traditional banking relationships by providing convenient, immediate access to financial services.

History
The first store opened in Denver, Colorado in 1968. A local entrepreneur saw an opportunity with bank deregulation to offer basic financial services with a retail presentation that emphasized convenience and service. The concept was successful and more stores were opened in Colorado and other states. The growing chain came to the attention of The Associates: a diverse financial services company headquartered in Irving, Texas. The Associates acquired the stores and continued to expand. Subsequently, The Associates decided to divest the stores and a sale was made to an investor group led by a former Associates executive.

Associations
ACE Cash Express is a member of the Financial Service Centers of America (FiSCA), a national trade association that represents financial service providers across the country and establishes best practices standards for the industry. Additionally, ACE is a member of state industry associations across the country in areas where it does business.

Community impact
Established in 2004, the ACE Community Fund is ACE Cash Express’ corporate giving program which benefits organizations that help children, support education and promote financial literacy. Since inception, the ACE Community Fund has donated more than $11 million to charitable organizations throughout the nation. Through corporate donations, in-store fundraising campaigns and employee volunteering programs, the ACE Community Fund supports communities across the country.

Organizations supported by the ACE Community Fund include: Adopt A Classroom, American Cancer Society, Autism Speaks, Back on My Feet, Big Brothers Big Sisters, Boys & Girls Clubs, Genesis Women’s Shelter, Junior Achievement, MenzFit, National Breast Cancer Foundation, National Down Syndrome Society, American Red Cross.

ACE has annual fundraising and volunteer programs including its Pink Month and Give A Little Campaign, which encourage customer and employee involvement.

Pink Month

Since 2006, ACE Cash Express has partnered with Netspend to host its annual Pink Month to raise funds and awareness for breast cancer. Through the 11-year partnership, over $5 million has been donated to the National Breast Cancer Foundation. Each October, a portion of each purchase made with the ACE Elite Pink Card and ACE Flare Pink Card up to $350,000 is donated to NBCF.

Give A Little Campaign

ACE’s annual in-store fundraising campaign, the Give A Little campaign, supports employee-selected charities by collecting donations to benefit a variety of organizations across the country.

Legal actions
On July 10, 2014, it was announced that ACE Cash Express had agreed to a $10 million cash settlement with the federal Consumer Financial Protection Bureau over abusive debt collection practices. ACE denied any wrongdoing.

On November 5, 2015, the company entered into a settlement agreement with the California Department of Business Oversight to resolve allegations of violations of the California Deferred Deposit Transaction Law.

References

External links

Financial services companies established in 1968
Companies based in Irving, Texas
Financial services companies of the United States
Payday loan companies
American companies established in 1968
1968 establishments in Texas